Michael Joseph Hogan (April 22, 1871 – May 7, 1940) was an American businessman and politician from Brooklyn, New York.  A Republican, he was most notable for his service on New York City's board of aldermen and as a U.S. Representative from New York.

Biography
Born in New York City, Hogan attended both parochial and public schools, after which he worked in the freight forwarding and trucking industry.

He served as a member of the 13th Regiment, New York National Guard from 1889 to 1898 and advanced through the ranks from private to sergeant.  From 1914 to 1920 he served on the New York City Board of Aldermen.   He served as delegate to the Republican state conventions in 1914, 1918, 1920, 1922, 1924, and 1926.

He was elected as a Republican to the Sixty-seventh Congress (March 4, 1921 – March 3, 1923).   He was an unsuccessful candidate for reelection in 1922 to the Sixty-eighth Congress.

Hogan was appointed secretary to the Collector of the Port of New York. In 1934, he was arrested and accused of attempting to extort bribes in exchange for aid in obtaining master plumbers' licenses for unqualified individuals. In 1937, Hogan testified for the state in the trial of the accused murderers of Samuel Drukman, and as a result he received a suspended sentence for his role in the license scandal.  In 1935, he was accused of accepting bribes to help three Italian immigrants avoid deportation by obtaining U.S. citizenship.  Hogan provided false affidavits stating they had arrived before 1924, which would have made them eligible for citizenship, when in fact they arrived after 1924, meaning they were ineligible.  Hogan was convicted and sentenced to a year and a day in federal prison.

Death and burial
Hogan died in Rockville Centre, New York, May 7, 1940.  He was interred at Green-wood Cemetery in Brooklyn.

Family
In 1906, Hogan married Anna Marie Brittan.   Their children included Annmarie (b. 1907) and Redmond (1910-1990).

See also
List of American federal politicians convicted of crimes

References

External links

Michael J. Hogan at The Political Graveyard

1871 births
1940 deaths
American politicians convicted of federal public corruption crimes
Burials at Green-Wood Cemetery
New York (state) politicians convicted of crimes
New York City Council members
New York National Guard personnel
Republican Party members of the United States House of Representatives from New York (state)